MIS AG is a German vendor of corporate performance management software. It was founded in Darmstadt in 1988. Started as a consulting company and reseller of the Applix products, MIS AG developed their own product similar to TM/1. In 1997, MIS AG settled a legal dispute with Applix regarding intellectual property.

MIS DecisionWare is a suite of Business Intelligence software:
 MIS Alea - a MOLAP application server
 MIS onVision (reporting on the Web)
 MIS Plain (reporting in Excel, linked to MIS Alea and Microsoft Analysis Services and SAP B/W)
 MIS Common Object Store (storage of users rights and reports)
 CubeWare Import Master (ETL)
 Bissantz DeltaMiner (Data Mining)

MIS DecisionWare Applications:
 MIS Enterprise Planning
 MIS Balanced Scorecard
 MIS Subsidiary Management
 MIS Financial Consolidation
 MIS Risk Management

In October 2003, MIS AG was acquired by UK-based Systems Union Group.

In August 2006, Systems Union Group together with MIS AG was acquired by Infor.

References

External links
Infor

Software companies established in 1988
Software companies of Germany
1988 establishments in West Germany
Companies based in Hesse